Elkton Armory is a historic National Guard armory located at Elkton, Cecil County, Maryland.  It was constructed in 1915 and is a two-story brick structure with full basement faced with light gray granite, with a narrower one-story drill hall attached.  Its design imitates a castle, with corner towers flanking two-story curtain walls with irregular window placement.  The front facade features a projecting center gate, flanked by buttresses, with a carved relief of the State Seal of Maryland above the entry.

It was listed on the National Register of Historic Places in 1985.

References

External links
, including photo from 1985, at Maryland Historical Trust

Buildings and structures in Cecil County, Maryland
Armories on the National Register of Historic Places in Maryland
Elkton, Maryland
Infrastructure completed in 1915
National Register of Historic Places in Cecil County, Maryland